The New World Order is the fourth and final album by the hip hop group Poor Righteous Teachers, released in 1996. The effort didn't sell as well as their past work, but received strong reviews. The New World Order features production from PRT members Father Shaheed and Culture Freedom, as well as Ezo Brown, KRS-One and DJ Clark Kent, and is the group's only album to not contain production by frequent collaborator Tony D. Guest appearances include the Fugees, KRS-One, Nine, Brother J of X-Clan and Junior Reid. The album contains the singles "Word Iz Life" b/w "Dreadful Day" and "Conscious Style". 

The liner notes included information from Five-Percent Nation teachings.

Track listing

Album singles

Album chart positions

Singles chart positions

References

External links 

Profile Records albums
1996 albums
Poor Righteous Teachers albums